Paco Sanz may refer to:

Paco Sanz (actor), Spanish actor
Paco Sanz (footballer) (born 1972), Spanish footballer
Paco Sanz (sport shooter), Spanish sport shooter